Kodeni Solar Power Station, is a  solar power plant, under construction in Burkina Faso. The solar farm is under development by the French IPP, Africa Ren, with funding from European financial institutions, led by FMO Entrepreneurial Development Bank of the Netherlands. Société Nationale d'électricité du Burkina Faso (SONABEL), the state-owned electricity utility company has signed a 25-year power purchase agreement (PPA), with Koden Solar SASU, the special purpose vehicle company established by the owners to own, develop, operate and maintain the solar farm.

Location
The development will be located near the city of Bobo-Dioulasso, the second-largest city in Burkina Faso.

Overview
The power station is under development by Africa Ren, a French IPP headquartered in Paris, France. Africa Ren, the sole owner, has incorporated a subsidiary in Mauritius, Africa Ren Invest Limited, an independent power producer (IPP), that is active in West Africa. Kodeni Solar SASU is a special purpose vehicle company established under Burkinabe jurisdiction to own, develop, operate and maintain this power station.

The energy generated at this plant will be sold to SONABEL, the national electricity company of Burkina Faso, for integration in the national power grid. A 25-year power purchase agreement has been signed between SONABEL and the solar farm developers.

Funding
The cost of construction is reported to be €41 million (US$47.7 million). The table below illustrates the funding sources for Kodeni Solar Power Station.

Other considerations
The engineering, procurement and construction (EPC) contract was awarded to INEO by EQUANS, a subsidiary of the Engie Group.

Annual energy generation at this power station is calculated at 73 GWh, sufficient to power 115,000 Burkinabe homes. It will also avoid the emission of 41,000 tons of carbon dioxide every year.

One hundred and fifty construction jobs are expected to be created. After construction, thirty-five permanent employees will be required to operate the solar farm.

See also

 List of power stations in Burkina Faso
 Tenkodogo Solar Power Station

References

External links
 Africa REN starts construction for 38MW Burkina Faso solar project As of 25 October 2021.

Solar power stations in Burkina Faso
Bobo-Dioulasso
Houet Province
Hauts-Bassins Region
Energy infrastructure in Africa